Pativilca is one of five districts of the province Barranca in Peru.

References

  Instituto Nacional de Estadística e Informática. Banco de Información Digital. Retrieved February 28, 2008.
  Municipalidad Distrital de Pativilca. Municipalidad Distrital de Pativilca. Retrieved February 28, 2008.

External links
  Municipal website

Districts of the Lima Region